Arthur John Baron (born January 5, 1950)  is an American jazz trombonist. He also plays didgeridoo, conch shell, penny-whistle, alto and bass recorder, and tuba.

Career overview 
Baron is an alumnus of the Berklee College of Music. He joined the Duke Ellington band in August 1973 at the age of 23 during the last year Ellington led the band and was the last trombonist Ellington ever hired. Baron leads The Duke's Men, a band made up of Duke Ellington band alumni. He has performed and/or recorded with Buddy Rich, Bruce Springsteen, Lou Reed, Stevie Wonder, James Taylor, Illinois Jacquet, Sam Eckhardt, Roswell Rudd, Mel Tormé, Charlie Musselwhite, Andy Harlow (né Andre H. Kahn; born 1945), Fontella Bass, Sam Rivers, Glen Velez, John Tchicai, Wilber Morris, Alan Silva, George Gruntz, Joey DeFrancesco, Bobby Watson, Elliott Sharp, Annea Lockwood, Matt Glaser, Cyro Baptista, and She & Him.

Baron lives in New York City.

Discography 
Ray Anderson: Big Band Record (Gramavision, 1994) with the George Gruntz Concert Jazz Band
 Alice Babs: Far Away Star (Bluebell, 1973–1976); 
 Duke Ellington: Continuum (Fantasy, 1974–1975); 
 Joey DeFrancesco: Where Were You? (Columbia, 1990); 
 George Gruntz Concert Jazz Band: Blues 'n Dues et cetera (Enja, 1991); 
 George Gruntz Concert Jazz Band: Beyond Another Wall (TCB (de), 1994); 
 George Gruntz Concert Jazz Band: Merryteria (TCB, 1999); 
 Lincoln Center Jazz Orchestra: Portraits by Ellington (Columbia, 1992); 
 Hal Willner Presents: Weird Nightmare: Meditations on Mingus (Columbia, 1992); 
 Mingus Big Band: Nostalgia in Times Square (Dreyfus, 1993); 
 Sam Rivers' Rivbea All-star Orchestra, Culmination (BMG France, 1999)
 David Sanborn: Another Hand (Elektra, 1990), Upfront (Elektra, 1991); 
 Alan Silva: Alan Silva & the Sound Visions Orchestra (Eremite, 1999); 
 Peggy Stern: Actual Size (Koch, 1998); 
 Frank Wess: Entre Nous (Concord, 1990); 
 New York Composers Orchestra, music of Marty Ehrlich, Robin Holcomb, Wayne Horvitz, Doug Wieselman (de) (New World, 1990); 
 New York Composers Orchestra: First Program in Standard Time (New World, 1990–1992); 
 Bruce Springsteen: Wrecking Ball (Columbia, 2012); 
 She & Him: Classics (Columbia, 2014);

References

External links
 Art Baron discography, Artistdirect
 "Inside the Ellington Band," by Nat Hentoff, Jazz Times, October 2006

1950 births
Living people
American jazz trombonists
Male trombonists
Didgeridoo players
Tin whistle players
American recorder players
Conch players
American jazz tubists
American male jazz musicians
Musicians from Bridgeport, Connecticut
Duke Ellington Orchestra members
Berklee College of Music alumni
CIMP artists
21st-century tubists
Harlem Blues and Jazz Band members
The Sessions Band members
21st-century flautists